Tamarix aphylla is the largest known species of Tamarix, with heights up to . The species has a variety of common names, including Athel tamarisk, Athel tree, and Athel pine. It is an evergreen tree, native across North, East, and Central Africa, through the Middle East, and into parts of Western and Southern Asia.

Distribution
Tamarix aphylla is found along watercourses in arid areas. It is very resistant to saline and alkaline soils. Its range extends from latitude 35°N to 0°N, and its W–E range extends from Morocco and Algeria in North Africa, eastwards to Egypt, and south to the Horn of Africa and into Kenya. It is found in the Middle East and the Arabian Peninsula, east through Iran, and into Pakistan, Afghanistan, and India.

Description
The tiny leaves are alternately arranged along the branches, and exude salt, which can form a crusted layer on the surface, and drip onto the ground beneath. The species can reproduce by seed, by suckering, or from a cutting.
It blooms between July till November.

Uses
Tamarix aphylla has been used as a windbreak and shade tree in agriculture and horticulture for decades, especially in dryer regions such as the western United States and central and western Australia. Due to its higher fire adaptability, it can be used as a barrier to fire. Even when dry, the wood of Tamarix is difficult to burn, due to the high ash content (30–40%) and higher salt content of its foliage. After a fire it usually regrows, unless the root-crown is destroyed.

The nectar from the blossoms of Tamarix aphylla produces high-quality honey with a unique taste. Due to the drought- and salt-tolerant properties of the tree, it could be planted as an agroforestry species, as well as for reclamation of marginal lands. A vegetative propagation method for the tree using the aeroponics technique has recently been developed.

Australia
Within these regions, it has spread, most dramatically and noticeably in central Australia after the floods of 1974 along the Finke River in the Northern Territory. Since then it has become a serious weed and invasive species in the Northern Territory and Western Australia. The species had been present for many decades without much spread before this.

It tends to use more water than most native plants in Australia, which it outcompetes. It has replaced the indigenous eucalyptus along watercourses in the interior. It has been declared a weed of national significance in Australia.

United States
It is commonly used for windbreaks on the edges of agricultural fields and as a shade tree in the deserts of the Southwestern United States. This species has not naturalized in areas of the United States where it has been grown, unlike other species in the genus Tamarix that are vigorously invasive.

History
Most botanists and Bible scholars believe that the eshel tree planted by Abraham in the Book of Genesis, was Tamarix aphylla, Carl Linnaeus wrote that its name was derived from the Ancient Greek 'a' "without", and 'phyllon''' "leaf".

In Urdu and Hindi, the tree is called farash and in Punjabi, it is called kooan. In Baluchi, it is called shakargaaz or siahgaaz. In Saraiki, it is called Khagal.

Chemistry
2,6-Digalloyl glucose and 3,6-digalloyl glucose are gallotannins found in galls of T. aphylla''.

References
 

aphylla
Flora of North Africa
Flora of Western Asia
Trees of Africa
Flora of Eritrea
Flora of Libya
Flora of Algeria
Flora of Egypt
Flora of Chad
Flora of Sudan
Flora of Pakistan
Garden plants of Africa
Drought-tolerant trees
Flora of Israel
Flora of Palestine (region)
Taxa named by Carl Linnaeus